Isallt Bach is a hamlet in the  community of Trearddur, Ynys Môn, Wales, which is 138.7 miles (223.3 km) from Cardiff and 225.8 miles (363.4 km) from London.

References

See also
List of localities in Wales by population 

Villages in Anglesey